Hezar Mani (also Romanized as Hezār Manī, also known as Hezār Manī-ye Barāftāb) is a village in Teshkan Rural District, Chegeni District, Dowreh County, Lorestan Province, Iran. At the 2006 census, its population was 83, in 17 families.

References 

Towns and villages in Dowreh County